Viola rotundifolia, common name roundleaf yellow violet, is a plant species of the genus Viola. It is found in mesic habitat areas of the eastern United States and Canada; from Tennessee and Kentucky south to Georgia.  It grows 2 to 4 inches tall with leaves and flowers on separate stalks.

References

rotundifolia
Flora of the Appalachian Mountains